Baldellia ranunculoides, the lesser water-plantain, is a species of flowering plant in the family Alismataceae.

Synonyms
Alisma ranunculoides, Echinodorus ranunculoides, Sagittaria ranunculodes

Description
Each flower stalk bears one or two umbels of up to five flowers each, and often only a single flower. When not in flower, B. ranunculoides can be mistaken for lesser spearwort, Ranunculus flammula, which grows in similar locations.

Distribution
Baldellia ranunculoides is found along the Atlantic and Baltic coast of western and northern Europe, and along the Mediterranean coasts of southern Europe, Turkey and North Africa.  Recently found in eastern Newfoundland, Bristol's Hope barachois, Avalon Peninsula, the only location in North America. May have been introduced by a float (Sarracenia magazine, Newfoundland and Labrador Wildflower Society.

References

External links

Alismataceae
Flora of Europe
Flora of North Africa
Plants described in 1753
Taxa named by Carl Linnaeus
Freshwater plants